Elani Landman (born 18 October 1993 in Port Elizabeth) is a South African professional squash player. As of February 2018, she was ranked number 99 in the world.

References

1993 births
Living people
South African female squash players